Julien Stevens (born 25 February 1943) is a retired Belgian cyclist who raced from 1963 to 1977. Stevens spent most part of his career employed to help other riders, such as Rik Van Steenbergen, Rik Van Looy and Eddy Merckx. In 1969, at the road world championship in Zolder he got clear with Dutchman Harm Ottenbros but lost the sprint.

Stevens was also active in track cycling, where he was Belgian national champion in many competitions.

Major results

1966
 1st Stage 5 Volta a Catalunya

1968
 1st  Road Race, Belgian National Road Race Championships 
 1st Individual Pursuit, Belgian National Track Cycling Championships 
 1st Grand Prix Pino Cerami

1969
 1st Stage 8 Tour de Suisse
 1st Stage 2 Tour de France
 2nd  Road race, UCI Road World Championships 

1972
 1st Six Days of Ghent (with Patrick Sercu) 
 1st Six days of Montréal

1973
 1st Omnium, Belgian National Track Cycling Championships 
 1st Team Pursuit, Belgian National Track Cycling Championships 

1974
 1st Six Days of Ghent (with Graeme Gilmore) 
 1st Stage 5a Tour of Belgium

1975
 1st stage 19 Vuelta a España

1976
 1st Half Fond, Belgian National Track Cycling Championships

External links

Belgian male cyclists
Belgian track cyclists
Belgian Tour de France stage winners
Belgian Vuelta a España stage winners
1943 births
Living people
Sportspeople from Mechelen
Cyclists from Antwerp Province
Tour de Suisse stage winners